Romeo & Duet is a British television dating game show that aired on ITV from 16 April to 11 June 2022 and is hosted by Oti Mabuse.

Format
Singers have one song to entice a singleton (picker) down from a balcony and meet face-to-face. The newly formed couple will then head off on a duet-date to learn a duet, before returning later in the show to perform that number in a singing competition against the other couples. The studio audience then votes the winning couple for each episode. The prize is a Virgin Experience Day to go on another date.

References

External links
 

2022 British television series debuts
2022 British television series endings
2020s British game shows
British reality television series
Dating and relationship reality television series
English-language television shows
ITV game shows